Donald Davies (1924–2000) was a Welsh computer scientist.

Donald Davies may also refer to:
Donald Davies (bishop) (1920–2011), American Episcopal bishop
Donnie Davies, 2007 fictional American anti-homosexual campaigner

See also
Donald Davis (disambiguation)